Atish Raj (also spelled, Aatish Raj), was an industrial and avant-garde Pakistani rock band formed and fronted by Pakistani music journalist and writer, Nadeem F. Paracha.

Relaunch 
In a recent development Paracha was approached by Zeeshan Pervez, leader of Sajid & Zeeshan, for the remixing of an Atish Raj song, "War in Heaven." The song was  relaunched in February 2007.

See also 
 List of Pakistani music bands

References

Pakistani musical groups
Pakistani rock music groups
Musical groups established in 1994
1994 establishments in Pakistan